Donald Ben Marsh (24 November 1903 – 5 February 1973) was Bishop of The Arctic from 1950 to 1973.

Educated at the University of Saskatchewan and ordained in 1929, he began his career as a  missionary at Eskimo Point. Later he was the incumbent at All Saints Cathedral, Aklavik then Archdeacon of Baffin Land. He was the second Bishop of The Arctic and became at some point a Doctor of Divinity (DD).

References

1903 births
University of Saskatchewan alumni
Anglican archdeacons in North America
Anglican bishops of The Arctic
20th-century Anglican Church of Canada bishops
1973 deaths